Valeriy Gorban (born February 6, 1973) is a rally driver from Ukraine.

From 2002 to 2020, Gorban took part in 193 national and international competitions.

Career in the championship of Ukraine in rally

2002—2007: MacCoffee Rally Team
For the first time in his life Valeriy sat behind the wheel of a sports car in 2002, at the age of 29, already being a businessman, creator and head of the racing team MacCoffee Rally Team. During the 2002 season in the Ukrainian Rally Championship, team colors were defended by Alexander Salyuk, Sr. and Alexander Salyuk, Jr .; Gorban joined them only at the final stage of the championship in Kherson.

Already in the following year, 2003, Valeriy Gorban and his navigator Evgeny Leonov as part of the MacCoffee Rally Team are conducting the full Ukrainian championship in rallying the Lada 2112 Super 1600 car. Having won five races out of six possible, the crew becomes the champion in the A9 class, and MacCoffee again wins in the team classification.

However, since the next season, due to changes in the rules of the championship, team-mates, Alexander Salyuk Jr. and Valeriy Gorban, performing on the same cars, turn out to be rivals in class A7. As a result, the championships of 2004 and 2005 become a duel of two fastest monoprivot pilots, which ends with a battle draw: in 2004, Salyuk becomes champion of Ukraine in the A7 class, in 2005 – Gorban. And a year later, both pilots are synchronously transplanted to the higher-class vehicles – all-wheel drive Mitsubishi Lancer Evolution.

The 2006 season demonstrates that Valeriy Gorban can rightly be counted among the leaders of the Ukrainian rally. Podiums on the rally "Chumatsky Shlyakh" and "Golden Autumn of the Carpathians" allowed the pilot to take the sixth place in the overall standings of the championship in the end of the season. The result could have been higher, but the result of Gorban on the Trembit rally was canceled due to the mismatch of his car homologation card.

The next season for Gorban can to some extent be called experimental – more than half of the races he spends on the unusual for himself Subaru Impreza, built by the Kiev racer and engineer Andrei Alexandrov. The results of the pilot do not fall – he again finishes on the podium in the rally "Chumatsky Shlyakh", "Trembita" and "Galicia" and again at the end of the season is in the top five of the fastest participants in the championship of Ukraine. However, after the tragic death of Alexandrov at the Bulgarian rally "Sliven" Gorban returns to the cars of Mitsubishi Lancer, which are able to serve his own team.

2008: Prime Rally Team

The 2008 season begins for Valeriy and his team with a change of image – the side of the cars is decorated with the logo of the new title sponsor, the alcohol brand Prime. By a strange coincidence, this season becomes the worst in Gorban's career – he manages to finish only twice in the races of the championship of Ukraine, never once taking the podium. Unsuccessfully things are going on and the team – for the first time in its history, it falls to the third place in the standings of collectives. As a result, cooperation with the vodka ceases, and in the new season, the people of Kiev are under a new brand.

2009—2013: Mentos Ascania Racing
In 2009, the name of the Gorban team appears for the first time the name of its main company – Ascania. The season of 2009 did not become a breakthrough, although he brought the pilot the first podium in the Bukovina rally in two years, and the team headed by him returned to the top of the standings. But 2010 turned out to be much more successful.

Already from the first races it becomes clear that Gorban has seriously added in speed, as evidenced by the victories in the rally "Chumatsky Shlyakh", "Lviv Standard", "Alexandrov Rally" and "Alushta". And although in the decisive race, the rally "Yalta", the absolute championship again goes to Salyuk Jr., the season for Gorban ends on a positive note: the Ukrainian Cup in the rally is won, in the championship "silver" is won, the team again becomes the first among the teams.
The long-awaited champion crown goes to Valery a year later, in 2011, and, as many have noted, this is not without the help of Fortune. After the first race, held in Kherson, partner Gorban and his main competitor Alexander Salyuk, Jr., playing squash, breaks his collarbone and misses two championship races. Thus, the main rival of Valeriy in the struggle for the title is Odessa Yuri Kochmar – but he by coincidence passes one (final) stage of the championship. All this gave an occasion to the ill-wishers of Gorban to call his championship an accident, despite a convincing victory in the rally "Kievan Rus" and prizes in the rally "Chumatsky Shlyakh" and "Alushta".

Being in the status of the current champion of Ukraine, Gorban began the 2012 season from the podiums for the rally "Galicia" and "Mariupol", and by the middle of the season was on par with the departed by the time Alexander Salyuk, the youngest. However, the refusals of technology in Yalta and Kherson led to the fact that Valery not only gave the title to Alexander, but also dropped to the third line of the final protocol. At the same time, Gorban and the silver medalist Nikolai Chmykh-juny scored the same number of points, after which the seats were distributed according to additional indicators.

The 2013 season was a brilliant revenge Gorban in the championship fight. At the beginning of the season, both favorites are transplanted to higher-class cars: Gorban on the Mini Cooper RRC, Salyuk on the Ford Fiesta R5. Valery wins "Chumatsky Shlyakh" and "Galicia", while Alexander's victory is a victory in the "Alexandrov Rally" and the rally "Yalta". Everything is decided on the last race, the Trembit rally – and here Salyuk, unable to withstand the tension, gets off the track at the first stage, and Gorban becomes the absolute champion of Ukraine for the second time in his career.
After this success, being at the peak of the form, Valeriy Gorban stops his performances in the Ukrainian championship, fully focusing on the starts in the world championship.

2014 — :Eurolamp World Rally Team
Valeriy Gorban’s career has been undergoing changes since 2014. The team completely changed its colors and naming sponsor. Bright red colors became a thing of the past. Instead, Mini Cooper RRC got its new appearance - bright green with a red stripe alongside. Eurolamp brand has first become recognizable and associated with the up-to-date technologies in motor sport and thereafter in everyday life.

Early triumphs have been achieved already during the first year of rallying under new colors, when the team reached chemistry with its vehicle in WRC-2 standings. The second season on Mini Cooper RRC showed stability: 100% finish in 7 races, 2 victories on special stages and 10th place got in WRC-2 standings.

The team’s debut season was even more impressive. Eurolamp WRT got 87 points and 3rd place following the results of 2014.

Valeriy Gorban and Vladimir Korsi started 2015 with a podium – their crew took third place in WRC-2 standings during the Swedish rally. But the next sessions turned into a complete disappointment – there were 6 starts and only 3 finishes. At the season end, Valery Gorban’s 20 credit points allowed him to get 19th place in the final classification of WRC-2 standings. 5 victories on special stages of WRC-2 standings were the only thing to be proud of.

2016 was marked by new technical regulations and minor vehicle upgrade. And the team had to raise its vehicle status - Mini John Cooper Works RRC turned into Mini John Cooper Works WRC.

The vehicle appeared to be uncompetitive under the RRC specification in view of the new regulation requirements and compared with R5 class vehicles. But the most important thing was that its developer –Prodrive company - had no ideas of how to modify the car to meet new requirements.

Having the highest-category car at his disposal, Valeriy Gorban’s goal was to be in TOP10 in the overall standings. And it happened at the Mexican rally. 15th place was the best achievement in subsequent races of the season. At the end of 2016, Valery Gorban was on the last 25th position in the final ranking of the World Rally Championship.

For the first time since 2013, Valeriy Gorban used to participate in a rally on his native land. His Mitsubishi Lancer Evolution 9 started in the Star Fortetsya rally and easily won the victory with a tremendous advantage over the second prize-winner. His second start in Ukraine was at the end of the rally season, when Valery decided to surprise everyone with Mini John Cooper Works WRC notable by its very colorful painting.

2017 became the year of change. The Estonian Sergei Larens occupied the seat on the right of Valery Gorban, and the newly created team started in the new WRC-Trophy, where the previous-generation RC1 vehicles were allowed to participate.

2018 was started with a new program. It was decided to participate in the Latvian and Estonian Rally Championships. Two championships had common first races. Crew of Valeriy Gorban and Sergei Larens became the leader in both of them thanks to their victory at the season start and a prize place got in the next stage. In May, the championships’ paths diverged and the crew confirmed its leading ambitions in the Latvian Talsi rally. The Estonian spring-and-summer season started with Tallinn Rally and Viru Rally. Georg Gross - the three-time champion of Estonia - joined the battle right there. Two second places and keen struggle allowed the crew to talk about bright finish of the championship season.

The crew failed to compete at the extremely popular Estonian rally held as the stages of Latvian and Estonian championships. Valeriy Gorban’s injury got when landing on one of the hills did not allow the crew to realize its potential to the full extent. Eurolamp WRT had to miss the next common stage of two championships. Although it remained to be the leader of two championships owing to the credits earned earlier.

In 2019, it was decided to continue competitions in rally competitions in Latvia and Estonia. The winter part has traditionally started with stages in the east of Latvia. The fight for victory at the Aluxne rally in January went to the last special stages with Oliver Solberg, unfortunately the broken wheel did not allow to reach its full potential. As a result, the crew was satisfied with the second place in the overall standings. The next stage in Gulben did not allow to continue the podium series due to the loss of time in one of the turns. In May, due to the cancellation of the Estonian round, the crew was able to start in Ukraine. The restored Rally Fortecya was at a very high level, and the crew of Valery Gorban and Sergei Larens did not know the equal paths of Podillya. Fighting on two fronts continued in stages in Latvia and Estonia. In the summer, two silver awards were awarded in Estonia, but as a result of the year the victorious champagne crew never knew. This time, the results in the two championships, as well as last season, were also the same, but the championship unit changed to three.

Career in the World Rally Championship

For the first time at the World Championship, Valeriy Gorban started in 2009. The first attempt turned out to be quite successful: the Kyivan took the third place in the N4 class at the Polish rally. However, a full program of performances in the world championship was deployed two years later, in 2011.
The Mentos Ascania Racing team entered the World Cup 2011 with three crews, the first pilots in which were Valeriy Gorban, Alexander Salyuk, Jr. and Alexey Kikireshko. All three participated in the Production WRC and took part in six stages of the series. Gorban began the season with confidence – with the fourth place in Sweden and the fifth in Portugal, but then the results somewhat deteriorated. Only once, in Australia, Valery managed to climb again to the fifth place. However, and at the same time Gorban became the best representative of the team in this draw of the championship, taking the 8th position in the PWRC standings.

Significantly better for Valeriy next season, during which he also took part in six stages of the Production WRC. In the first race in Argentina, the crew of Valeriy Gorban and Andrei Nikolaev climbed to the podium, and a few weeks later in Greece he managed to win his first victory in the World Cup. During the season, third place was added to this in Italy and two fourth in New Zealand and Spain, which in total allowed the crew to become the first Ukrainian athletes to become bronze medalists of the World Rally Championship.

Starting in 2013, Valeriy transplanted to the higher-class equipment, the Mini Cooper RRC car, thus taking part in the classification of the newly formed WRC 2. The significantly increased level of competition plus the necessary period of adaptation to the new car does not allow Gorban to show the same high results in the 2013 season.

2014 was a year of change. A new coloring in the colors Eurolamp, brings the prize in the team event 3 place, and in the personal classification the 10th.

In 2015, Valeriy again enjoys the prize champagne, the third place in the WRC-2 standings, was won in the rally of Sweden.

In 2016 Valeriy brought to the launch of the Mini John Cooper Works WRC. At the end of the season, the asset was 1 point and 25th place in the final classification.

2017god not pleased with success in the absolute standings, the best achievement was the 13th place in the rally of Mexico, but the new-old assistant Valeria, Sergei Larens, became an accomplice in four victories in the WRC-Trophy standings.

Ring races
For quite a long period of time, Valeriy Gorban has acted in parallel both in rallying and in ring racing. In the Ukrainian championship, he started only twice, during 2006 – but even so, having won 4 races (two in each of the stages), he became the vice-champion of Ukraine in A3 class. However, most of Gorban's round starts took place at the German Nürburgring circuit as part of the German championship for many hours of VLN racing.

Debut in the endurance race fell in 2004. The debut starts for Honda Civic brought two wins in the class.

2005 did not bring catwalks in the class and next season Valeriy Gorban moves to the BMW M3 E46. Since 2006, Valeriy's partner has been Stanislav Gryazin for many years. In the three races of the season, an international blow has extracted one bronze and one silver in the class, and the finish in the top twenty has become common.

In 2007 comes the first joint victory in its class, a little later and the second, three finishes in the first ten of the absolute test showed the level of the crew, which 2008 starts with the next update of equipment, this time at the disposal of Valeriy and Stanislav Porsche 996 RSR, which allowed to fight for victories on the North loop. In 9 races of the season, the crew finishes 6 times in the top-10, once the crew was a step from the podium of the absolute standings, 4th place remained the highest achievement of Valery in the absolute standings of the VLN races.

In 2008 Valeriy Gorban took part in the cult race ADAC Zurich 24h Rennen, the international crew saw the finish in the tenth place of the absolute standings.

In 2009, joint performances could not be continued because of the refusal of the German Consulate to extend the visa to Stanislav Gryazin, Valeriy Gorban only went on a start in the crew with Olexii Kikireshko and Ralph Wagner, but 2 in the class. remained the only and for today the last finish of Kiev in the endurance race.

Social activity
Gorban was a member of the Automobile Federation of Ukraine (FAU), for many years joining the various governing structures of this organization. So, in 2005, Valery joined the FAU Presidium, and, beginning in 2008, focused on the development of rally discipline, joining the FAU Rally Committee, and in 2012 heading it.

Gorban's chairmanship saw an increase in Ukrainian activity in rallying. Ukraine hosted several stages of the European Rally Cup, held joint competitions with the Russian and Belarusian automobile federations. In 2012, the chairman of the FIA rally committee Jonathan Ashman visited the country, at a meeting with which the prospects of holding the World Rally Championship stage in the Carpathians were discussed.

At the initiative and with the support of Valeriy Gorban, such progressive innovations as the broadcasting of the results of the competition online, the broadcasting of a specialized rally radio, the installation of participants' cars for the safety of GPS trackers, the ban on more than two uses of the same ones the same special stages and much more. Largely thanks to these innovations, Ukraine has risen in the ranks of the World Countries Ranking rankings from the 27th place in 2011 to the 13th in 2012, and then to the 5th in 2013.

Gorban resigned from all posts in the automobile federation in early 2014.

WRC results

WRC results

PWRC results

WRC-2 results

WRC Trophy results

References

External links

Profile on ewrc-results.com

1973 births
Living people
World Rally Championship drivers
Ukrainian rally drivers
Ukrainian racing drivers
Nürburgring 24 Hours drivers